Stephen Steele Barlow (August 17, 1818October 5, 1900) was an American lawyer and Republican politician.  He was the 10th Attorney General of Wisconsin and served four years in the Wisconsin Legislature.  He also served several years as a district attorney and county judge.

Background 
Barlow was born on August 17, 1818, in Ballston Spa, New York, and moved with his family at an early age to Genesee County, New York. He attended public schools and was graduated from Rochester Seminary in New York in 1837. He began reading the law in Albany, New York.

In Wisconsin 
Barlow came to Wisconsin about 1840, continued his legal studies, and settled at Delavan in Walworth County, where in 1841 he was admitted to the bar. He was elected as a Free Soiler member of the Assembly from Walworth county in 1851 for a one-year term, and in 1853 became that county's district attorney.

He moved to Sauk County in May 1854, settled in  Delton (then called New Buffalo) in 1855, and was elected as a County Judge in 1857, for the term of four years.

Republican politician 
By the beginning of the 1860 presidential election campaign, he had become part of the Republican Party, declaring that "the spirit of abolition is the spirit of the Republican Party", and that the Republicans, considering slavery "morally and politically wrong", opposed its spread as the first step in its complete abolition. He was elected District Attorney of Sauk County in 1862, and re-elected in 1864. he was elected to Sauk County's 2nd Assembly district (Towns of New Buffalo, Dellona, Winfield, La Valle, Woodland, Ironton, Reedsburg, Excelsior, Baraboo, Fairfield, Greenfield and Freedom) for 1867, succeeding fellow Republican Rollin Strong; then to the Wisconsin State Senate's 14th District from 1868 to 1869, to succeed Argalus Starks (a War Democrat then part of the Union Party). He was succeeded in the Assembly by John Gillespie. He was a Republican elector for Ulysses S Grant in 1868.

He was elected Wisconsin Attorney General in 1869 with 69,746 votes, against 60,510 for Democrat Silas U. Pinney., being succeeded in the Senate by fellow Republican Bennett Strong, and re-elected in 1871, with 78,326 votes against 68,807 for Edward S. Bragg, Democrat.

After serving as Attorney General 
Except for a two-year sojourn in Chippewa Falls, Barlow lived in Delton and Baraboo until 1893, when he moved to the St. Paul, Minnesota, home of his son Henry P. Barlow. He died there on October 5, 1900.

Electoral history

Wisconsin Attorney General (1869, 1871)

| colspan="6" style="text-align:center;background-color: #e9e9e9;"| General Election, November 2, 1869

| colspan="6" style="text-align:center;background-color: #e9e9e9;"| General Election, November 7, 1871

References

}

People from Ballston Spa, New York
Wisconsin Attorneys General
District attorneys in Wisconsin
Wisconsin Free Soilers
19th-century American politicians
Republican Party Wisconsin state senators
Republican Party members of the Wisconsin State Assembly
1818 births
1900 deaths
1868 United States presidential electors
Wisconsin state court judges
American lawyers admitted to the practice of law by reading law
People from Delavan, Wisconsin
19th-century American judges